A Lombard band is a decorative blind arcade, usually located on the exterior of building. It was frequently used during the Romanesque and Gothic periods of Western architecture. It resembles a frieze of arches.

Lombard bands are believed to have been first used during the First Romanesque period, in the early 11th century. At that time, they were  the most common architectural decorative motif for facades in regions such as Lombardy, Aragon and Catalonia. Arches of early Christian buildings of Ravenna, such as the Mausoleum of Galla Placidia, have been suggested as the origin of Lombard bands.

See also
 Lombard architecture 
 Lesene (low-relief pillars), another Lombardic element

Similar-looking structures:
 Corbels
 Jettying

External links

An illustrated article by Peter Hubert on the developments of Lombard bands

Architectural elements
Ornaments (architecture)
Arches and vaults
Gothic architecture
Lombard architecture
Romanesque architecture